Christopher Sherrington (born 21 October 1983 in Ormskirk, England) is a British judoka. He competed at the 2012 Summer Olympics in the +100 kg event.

Judo career
Sherrington born in Ormskirk, England came to prominence when he became champion of Great Britain, winning the heavyweight division at the British Judo Championships in 2005. He repeated the success three years later in 2008.

In 2012, he was selected to represent Great Britain at the 2012 Olympic Games in London. Competing in the men's +100 kg category he lost his second round match to eventual silver medallist Alexander Mikhaylin. The following year Sherrington secured his third British heavyweight title. In 2014, he won the gold medal for Scotland at the 2014 Commonwealth Games in heavyweight division. He defeated South African Ruan Snyman in the final. 

In 2019, Sherrington won a fourth British Championship title.

Personal life
Sherrington is a Royal Marines Commando.

References

External links

 
 
 

1983 births
Living people
Scottish male judoka
Olympic judoka of Great Britain
Judoka at the 2012 Summer Olympics
People from Ormskirk
Royal Marines ranks
Judoka at the 2014 Commonwealth Games
Commonwealth Games medallists in judo
Commonwealth Games gold medallists for Scotland
Medallists at the 2014 Commonwealth Games